Shikōkai is a faction led by Tarō Asō within the Liberal Democratic Party (LDP). It is currently the third-largest faction within the LDP. It was established in 2017.

References 

Political party factions in Japan
2017 establishments in Japan
Liberal Democratic Party (Japan)